Lake Iijärvi may refer to:

 Lake Iijärvi (Inari)
 Lake Iijärvi (Ristijärvi)
 Lake Iijärvi (Suomussalmi)